|}

The Wasdell Group Silver Trophy Handicap Hurdle is a Class 2 National Hunt hurdle race in Great Britain which is open to horses aged four years or older. It is run at Chepstow over a distance of about 2 miles and 3½ furlongs (2 miles 3 furlong and 100 yards, or 3,914 metres). It is a handicap race, and it is scheduled to take place each year in October. Many top class horses have won the race including Don't Push It in 2007. The Jonjo O'Neill trained gelding went on to win the Grand National in 2010.

The race was first run in 1988 and was awarded Grade 3 status in 2011. It is the feature race on day two of Chepstow's October Jumps Season Opener meeting. It was downgraded to Class 2 status by the British Horseracing Authority in 2022.

Winners

See also
 Horse racing in Great Britain
 List of British National Hunt races

References

Racing Post:

Chepstow Racecourse
National Hunt races in Great Britain
National Hunt hurdle races
Recurring sporting events established in 1988
1988 establishments in Wales